The 1974 New Orleans Saints season was the team’s eighth as a member of the National Football League (NFL). This was their final season at Tulane Stadium as the Louisiana Superdome opened the following season. They matched their previous season's output of 5–9. The team failed to qualify for the playoffs for the eighth consecutive season.

Despite another losing record, the Saints defeated two of the NFC's four playoff entries, ousting the Los Angeles Rams 20–7 in week 10 and the St. Louis Cardinals 14–0 in week 13, both at home. The win over the Cardinals was the Saints’ final game at Tulane Stadium.

The Saints ended an 18-game winless streak on the road when they defeated the Atlanta Falcons in week six. However, they would not win again away from New Orleans until 1976 when they defeated the Kansas City Chiefs. From 1972 through 1975, the Saints were 1–26–1 on the road.

The win at Atlanta-Fulton County Stadium allowed New Orleans to complete its first season sweep of Atlanta since the Saints and Falcons became division rivals in 1970. The Saints entered 1974 with a nine-game losing streak to their archrival, including a humiliating 62-7 rout at home in the previous season's opener. New Orleans did not sweep Atlanta again until 1983.

Offseason

NFL draft

Personnel

Staff

Roster

Schedule

Note: Intra-division opponents are in bold text.

Standings

References

External links
 1974 New Orleans Saints at Pro-Football-Reference.com

New Orleans Saints seasons
New Orleans Saints
New Orl